Humboldt is an unincorporated community in Ross County, in the U.S. state of Ohio.

History
Humboldt had its start in 1878 when the railroad was extended to that point. A post office called Humboldt was established in 1880, and remained in operation until 1935. Humboldt was a whistle stop on the Ohio Southern Railroad.

References

Unincorporated communities in Ross County, Ohio
Unincorporated communities in Ohio
1878 establishments in Ohio
Populated places established in 1878